Candide, or Optimism — Part II is an apocryphal picaresque novel, possibly written by Thorel de Campigneulles (1737–1809) or Henri Joseph Du Laurens (1719–1797), published in 1760. Candide was written by Voltaire and had been published a year earlier (1759). This work was banned and became popular enough that  The second part was attributed to both Campigneulles—"a now largely unknown writer of third-rate moralising novels;" and Laurens—who is suspected of having habitually plagiarised Voltaire. The story continued with Candide new adventures in the Ottoman Empire, Persia, and Denmark.
A new scholarly edition with introduction and notes all in French was produced in 2003 by Edouard Langille (see References), and in 2007, Langille also edited Candide en Dannemarc (Candide in Denmark), which takes up the story following Candide, Part II.

See also

Candide

Footnotes

References
 Clark, Roger. Candide, Wordsworth Classics 
Langille, Edouard (ed). Candide, seconde partie [1760]. Great Britain: University of Exeter Press, 2003.

1760 novels
18th-century French novels
Adaptations of works by Voltaire
Candide
French satirical novels
Picaresque novels
Sequel novels
Novels set in Iran
Novels set in the Ottoman Empire